is a Japanese clothing brand with its registered head office in Ayabe, Kyoto Prefecture, its Osaka head office, and a Tokyo office. It was established on August 10, 1896, by Tsurukichi Hatano, and was originally known as Gunze Silk Manufacturing Co., Ltd. .

The company started the Gunze Blue-Mountain Underwear brand in association with Daiei in 1962, and this brand was used for all sexes before the introduction of the Christie brand for women in 1968. In a three-year period from 1962 the brand made up 6 percent of Daiei's turnover of underwear. It began selling its clothing in Thailand in 2000.

The company's flagship outlet is in Harajuku.

References

External links
 Gunze
 Gunze 

Companies based in Osaka
Textile companies of Japan
Clothing brands
Underwear brands